Denmark is a nation that has appeared at Hopman Cup in 2012.

In 2012 Caroline Wozniacki became the 24th world No. 1 player in history to compete at the tournament.

Players
This is a list of players who have played for Denmark in the Hopman Cup.

Results

1 In the final round robin tie in 2012 against the Czech Republic, the dead mixed doubles rubber was not played.

References 

Hopman Cup teams
Hopman Cup
Hopman Cup